Pimentola is an electronic orchestral/industrial project from Finland. Originally formed in 1996 by Lempo and Turja, it has since become the solo project of Lempo. Early dark/black metal influences have been dropped and experimental, industrial, neoclassical, orchestral, ethnic and tribal sounds have been added. In 2006 Pimentola was signed to the highly influential Swedish label Cold Meat Industry, which released the CD Misantropolis in 2007.

Discography
 Tuoni Pauloo Tiukoin Sitein (CDr, 2004)
 Tuoni Pauloo Tiukoin Sitein (CDr, Mini, 2004)
 MM-MMV (CD, 2005)
 Pimentola (7", 2005)
 Pimentola / Dead Man's Hill (CDr, 2005)
 MM-MMV (Cass, 2006)
 Misantropolis (CD, 2007)

External links

Official
Official Pimentola website
Cold Meat Industry Website

Misc
Pimentola at Discogs

Finnish industrial music groups
Musical groups established in 1996
1996 establishments in Finland
Finnish alternative rock groups